I See You is the thirteenth studio album by Gong and the tenth album by the Daevid Allen version of the group, released on .

I See You is the last Gong album recorded with co-founder Daevid Allen before his death on 13 March 2015.

Recording 
I See You was engineered, mixed and produced by Orlando Monday Allen (Daevid Allen's son) at Flamedog Records Studios and at the Bananamoon Observatory Studios in New South Wales, Australia, with additional production by Dave Sturt and Daevid Allen.

Release 
The CD version has one extra track, "Pixielation".

Track listing

Personnel

Gong
Flamedog Alien  – beat/crash/kick/vocal - a.k.a. Orlando Allen  – drums, vocals on "The Eternal Wheel Spins" 
Unicorn Strut  – bass & invisible operas - a.k.a. Dave Sturt  – bass & computer samples 
Spiral K. Octoflash  – crunchbox & scythe guitar - a.k.a. Kavus Torabi  – neoprog smart guitar 
Fabuloso Golfcart  – winged guitars/glissando - a.k.a. Fabio Golfetti  – guitars, old school psych solos & glissando 
Eastwinds i.e. Windows  – saxo/flutes/lungs - a.k.a. Ian East  – saxs, flute 
Dada Ali  – bi-focal local vocals 'n' gliss - a.k.a. Daevid Allen  – gliss guitar and vocals

Special guests
Former Gong
Gilli Smyth  – sprinkled space whisper

Production credits
 Engineered, mixed and produced by Orlando Monday Allen at Flamedog Records Studios and at the Bananamoon Observatory Studios in New South Wales, Australia.
 Additional production by Dave Sturt and Daevid Allen.
 Mastered by Udi Koomran at Ginger Studio, Tel Aviv (Additional production on Daevid's vocal on track 11, "Thank You").
 Rhythm section for tracks 1,2,4,7,9,11 recorded by Alex Angeloni at Mosh Studios, Sâo Paulo, Brazil.
 All saxes and woodwinds recorded remotely by Ian East in his own studio.
 Gliss Guitar on "Shakti Yoni & Dingo Virgin" recorded by Toby Robinson at Moat Studios, London, UK.

References

2014 albums
Concept albums
Gong (band) albums